The 1883 Welsh Cup Final, was the sixth in the competition. It was contested by Wrexham and Druids at The Racecourse, Wrexham.

Route to the final

Wrexham

Druids

Final

References

1883
1882–83 in Welsh football
Wrexham A.F.C. matches
Druids F.C. matches